was a Sōtō Zen monk. He received dharma transmission from Gasan Jōseki and is considered a patriarch by the Sōtō school. He was the author of the Zenkai-ron (Treatise on Zen Precepts).

His disciple , who founded Akiba Souhonden Kasuisai in 1394, follows him in the line of patriarchs.

Notes

Further reading

External links
  Baizan at Tsuratsura Wiki

1417 deaths
Japanese Buddhist clergy
Year of birth unknown
Zen Buddhist monks